Inning may refer to:

Inning, a segment of a game in baseball and softball
Innings pitched, the number of innings a pitcher has completed
Innings, a segment of a game in cricket and rounders
Inning, land reclamation; innings, reclaimed land
towns:
Inning am Ammersee, a town in Landkreis Starnberg in Bavaria, Germany
Inning am Holz, a town in Landkreis Erding in Bavaria, Germany